Basil Frederick Hunter (29 November 1925 – 18 September 1970) was an Australian rules footballer who played for the Carlton Football Club in the Victorian Football League (VFL).

Notes

External links 

Basil Hunter's profile at Blueseum

1925 births
1970 deaths
Carlton Football Club players
Australian rules footballers from Melbourne
People from Carlton, Victoria